Kevin Fret Rodríguez (June 11, 1993 – January 10, 2019) was a Puerto Rican rapper, singer and the first openly gay male Latin trap artist. He was known for his gender-variant looks.

Career 
Between 2016 and 2018, Fret participated in singing competitions including La Banda and Solo Tu Voz. He used social media to advocate against bullying and used his voice as a member of the LGBT community to encourage other new artists beginning their careers. Fret released his breakthrough single, "Soy Asi" ("I'm Like This") on April 7, 2018 and was featured on Mike Duran's song "Diferente" ("Different"), released on July 18, 2018. Kevin Fret was managed by Alfonso J. Alvarez around the stretch of "Soy Asi".

Artistry 
Writer Samy Nemir Olivares described Fret as being known for "breaking gender norms [...] and stigma about being gay, gender nonconforming, and expressing gender identity freely – in a country where gay people still get mocked, bullied and killed".

Personal life 
Fret came out as gay at the age of 18. He was a graduate of the Roger L Putnam Vocational-Technical High School in Springfield, MA and had grown up in the city and in nearby Chicopee. Paper magazine described a "strict religious upbringing" as the reason he courted controversy in the LGBT community by saying that homosexuality was "a choice" for him. His parents were not supportive at first but were later accepting. He has a younger sister. Fret was public about undergoing liposuction surgery and buttock augmentation. While living in Miami in 2018, Fret was charged with aggravated battery after an alleged fight with another man, who Fret said had verbally attacked him because of his sexuality. He allegedly extorted another trap singer, Ozuna, for $50,000 over an edited sex tape made when Ozuna was a minor. Fret apologized to his family and friends over the extortion.

Death
On January 10, 2019, Fret was riding his motorcycle in Santurce, San Juan at about 5:30 am when an unidentified gunman shot at him eight times, hitting him in the head and hip. The incident was initially regarded by authorities as an automobile accident due to the darkness of the hour. Fret was taken to the Río Piedras Medical Center, where he was pronounced dead. According to police, Fret's murder was the 22nd homicide of 2019 in Puerto Rico. His murder remains unsolved.

Discography 
Singles 
 Soy Asi (2018)
 Me Compre Un Full Kevin Fret Remix (2018)

As Featured Artist 
 Mike Duran featuring Kevin Fret: Diferente (2018)

See also
Crime in Puerto Rico
History of violence against LGBT people in the United States
List of murdered hip hop musicians
List of unsolved murders
Significant acts of violence against LGBT people

References

External links
Kevin Fret on IMDb
Kevin Fret on YouTube

1994 births
2019 deaths
20th-century Puerto Rican LGBT people
21st-century Puerto Rican LGBT people
21st-century Puerto Rican male singers
Puerto Rican gay musicians
American murder victims
Deaths by firearm in Puerto Rico
Puerto Rican LGBT singers
LGBT people in Latin music
LGBT rappers
Gay singers
Male murder victims
People murdered in Puerto Rico
Unsolved murders in Puerto Rico
Violence against gay men
Violence against men in North America